Schoenwiese is a hamlet in Swift Current Rural Municipality No. 137, Saskatchewan, Canada. The hamlet is located on Highway 628 about 2 km north of Highway 379, about 15 km south of Swift Current.

See also

 List of communities in Saskatchewan
 Hamlets of Saskatchewan
 Russian Mennonite

References

Unincorporated communities in Saskatchewan
Swift Current No. 137, Saskatchewan